SS Lapland was a steam ocean liner built in Ireland for the Belgian Red Star Line. When new she was Red Star's flagship: similar in appearance to the company's SS Samland, SS Gothland and SS Poland, but far larger.
She was a half sister to White Star Line's "Big Four", just smaller and not as luxurious. They are similar in many ways, such as the island bridge, 4 masts, 2 funnels. But Lapland had a less luxurious interior.

Her ownership passed to the International Navigation Company in 1914 and the UK Leyland Line in 1927. In the First World War she was converted into a troop ship. In 1933 she was sold to Japanese buyers who scrapped her in 1934.

Building
Harland and Wolff built Lapland in Belfast, launching her on 27 June 1908 and completing her on 27 March 1909.

Red Star years
On 10 April 1909 Lapland began her maiden voyage from Antwerp via Dover to New York City under the Belgian flag. Lapland was one of a fleet of Red Star liners that between them provided weekly sailings on the route.

In April 1912 White Star Line chartered Lapland to repatriate 172 surviving members of Titanics crew to the UK after they had been detained in the USA for investigations. She also carried 1,927 bags of mail that Titanic had been scheduled to carry. Lapland arrived in England on 28 April, 13 days after Titanic sank.

In 1914 she made her last voyage between Antwerp and New York, was transferred to the US-owned International Navigation Company and began sailing between Liverpool and New York.

First World War
On 29 October 1914 Lapland began the Liverpool – New York City crossings under the UK flag while under charter to Cunard Line. In April 1917 she struck a naval mine off the Mersey Bar Lightship, but managed to reach Liverpool. She sailed from Halifax to Liverpool on 29 September 1916 with Canadian troops of the 150th Battalion of the Canadian Expeditionary Force. In June 1917 she was requisitioned and converted into a troop ship. Among her passengers in August 1917 were aviators of the 1st Aero Squadron, the first unit of the United States Army Air Service to reach France.

Post-war
 
On 24 November 1918 she began her first voyage after the Armistice when she sailed from Liverpool for New York for the White Star Line and on 1 August 1919 started her sixth and last round voyage on this service. On 16 September 1919 she was transferred to the Southampton – New York route under charter to White Star Line. She made three round voyages on this route, the last starting on 27 November 1919.

On 3 January 1920 she resumed service for Red Star Line but under the UK flag when she sailed from Antwerp via Southampton to New York. In 1927 she was transferred to Leyland Line and that April she was refitted to carry cabin, tourist and third class passengers. On 29 April 1932 she started her last voyage between Antwerp, Southampton, Le Havre and New York.

In 1932 and 1933 she was used on short cruises from London to the Mediterranean. Between June and September 1933 she carried 5,000 cruise passengers.

In October 1933 was sold to Japanese buyers for scrap. She was broken up in Osaka, starting on 29 January 1934.

References

Bibliography

External links

 

1908 ships
Maritime incidents in 1917
Ocean liners of the United Kingdom
Passenger ships of Belgium
Ships built in Belfast
Ships built by Harland and Wolff
Steamships of Belgium
Steamships of the United Kingdom
Troop ships of the United Kingdom
World War I passenger ships of the United Kingdom